Hibbertia nymphaea is a species of flowering plant in the family Dilleniaceae and is endemic to the south-west of Western Australia. It was first formally described in 1904 by Ludwig Diels in Botanische Jahrbücher für Systematik, Pflanzengeschichte und Pflanzengeographie. The specific epithet (nymphaea) is a reference to nymphs who live in fountains and rivers. 

Hibbertia nymphaea grows in seasonally wet places and near rivers in the Jarrah Forest, Swan Coastal Plain and Warren biogeographic regions of south-western Western Australia.

See also
List of Hibbertia species

References

nymphaea
Eudicots of Western Australia
Plants described in 1904
Taxa named by Ludwig Diels